Shiroishi Station (白石駅) is a Sapporo Municipal Subway station in Shiroishi-ku, Sapporo, Hokkaido, Japan. The station number is T13.

Platforms

Surrounding area
 Sapporo Shiroishi Ward Office and Ward Center
 Sapporo-shiroishi Health Center
 Tokou Store, Shiroishi
 Geo Dinos, Amusement Center Shiroishi
 Shiraishi Nangodori Post Office
 Hokuyu Lucky Supermarket, Shiroishi branch
 Royal Host Shiroishi shop
 North Pacific Bank branch Nangodori
 Beimen Shinkin Bank, Higashi-Sapporo branch

Gallery

External links

 Sapporo Subway Stations

 

Railway stations in Japan opened in 1976
Railway stations in Sapporo
Sapporo Municipal Subway